Mount Pelion is a rural locality in the Mackay Region, Queensland, Australia.

Geography 

The Bruce Highway enters the locality from the east (Mount Ossa) and exits the locality to the north-west (Calen). The North Coast railway line also enters from the east (Mount Ossa) and exits to the north-west Calen) but is north of highway.

Mount Pelion railway station is an abandoned railway station on the North Coast railway line in the east of the locality.

History 
The mountain was named by surveyor William Charles Borlase Wilson after the Greek mythological Mount Pelion. The locality and railway station take their name from the mountain.

Mount Pelion Provisional School opened on 26 February 1924. On 1 August 1926 it became Mount Pelion State School. It closed on 31 December 1970. The school was located about 19 Bogga Road. On 11 August 1987 the school building was relocated to Northview State School in Mount Pleasant but it gradually fell into disrepair. On 24 October 2014 the building was moved to Sarina to be restored as part of the Sarina Tourist Art and Craft Visitor Information Centre in Railway Square.

References

Further reading 

  —  includes Cameron's Pocket State School, Silent Grove State School, Mount Ossa State School, and Mount Pelion State School.

Mackay Region
Localities in Queensland